Ferdydurke is a novel by the Polish writer Witold Gombrowicz, published in 1937. It was his first and most controversial novel.

The book has been described as a "cult novel".

Contents
Gombrowicz himself wrote of his novel that it is not "... a satire on some social class, nor a nihilistic attack on culture... We live in an era of violent changes, of accelerated development, in which settled forms are breaking under life's pressure... The need to find a form for what is yet immature, uncrystalized and underdeveloped, as well as the groan at the impossibility of such a postulate – this is the chief excitement of my book."

Translations

The first translation of the novel, to Spanish, published in Buenos Aires in 1947, was done by Gombrowicz himself.  A translation committee presided over by the Cuban writer Virgilio Piñera helped him in this endeavor,  since Gombrowicz felt that he did not know the language well enough at the time to do it on his own. Gombrowicz again collaborated on a French translation of the book, with Ronald Martin in 1958. A direct German translation by Walter Tiel was published in 1960. In 2006, the first Brazilian Portuguese translation by Tomasz Barciński, direct from the Polish original text, was delivered.

The first English translation of Ferdydurke, by Eric Mosbacher, was published in 1961. It was a combined indirect translation of the French, German and possibly Spanish translations. In 2000, Yale University Press published the first direct translation from the original Polish. The 2000 edition, translated by Danuta Borchardt, has an introduction by Susan Sontag.

Direct and indirect translations now exist in over twenty languages.

Adaptations
Jerzy Skolimowski directed the 1991 film adaptation of Ferdydurke (alternate English title: 30 Door Key) with an international cast including Iain Glen, Crispin Glover, Beata Poźniak, Robert Stephens, Judith Godrèche, Zbigniew Zamachowski, and Fabienne Babe.

In 1999, Ferdydurke was adapted into a stage play by Provisorium & Kompania Theater from Lublin.

Analysis 
The novel has been described as a "meditation on stupidity and immaturity", with its other main themes being the tragedy of passing from immature, utopian youth to adulthood, and the degree to which culture can infantilize various subjects.

Reception 
The book was Gombrowicz's first and most controversial novel. It has been described since as a cult novel. Writing in 1995, Warren F. Motte commented that the book "exemplifies that rare bird of literary avant-garde: a text that retains, decades after its initial publication, the power to shock.".

References

External links
 Presentation, analysis and excerpt of Ferdydurke on the official website of Witold Gombrowicz
 Short extract at UK publisher website
 Overview at Polish Library
 Ferdydurke A. D. 1947: article about the publication of the Spanish translation in Argentina (PDF)
 YUP page with reviews 
 Review of the play in 2001 NYT
 Untranslatable elements in "Ferdydurke" 

1937 novels
Existentialist novels
Polish novels
Polish novels adapted into films
Polish novels adapted into plays
Polish satire
Satirical novels
Works by Witold Gombrowicz
Novels by Witold Gombrowicz